Karim R. Lakhani (born c. 1970) is a professor of business administration at Harvard Business School. He is the principal investigator of the Crowd Innovation Lab at the Harvard Institute for Quantitative Social Science. His research and teaching focuses on open and user innovation.

Life and work 
Lakhani earned a Bachelor in Engineering Management in 1993 at McMaster University, a Master of Science in Technology and Policy in 1999, and a Ph.D. in Management in 2006 at the MIT Sloan School of Management. His Ph.D. dissertation was advised by Eric von Hippel, with Tom Allen and Wanda Orlikowski.

Lakhani edited the book Perspectives on Free and Open Source Software published by MIT Press.

In addition to Open Source, Lakhani also studies crowdsourcing. In particular, he is known for his research on the T-shirt company Threadless, and prize-based open innovation firms like InnoCentive & Topcoder.

Selected publications 
 Jeppesen, Lars Bo, and Karim R. Lakhani. "Marginality and Problem-Solving Effectiveness in Broadcast Search." Organization Science 21: 1016–1033.
 Lakhani, Karim R., and Jill A. Panetta. "The Principles of Distributed Innovation." Innovations: Technology, Governance, Globalization 2, 3: 97–112.
 Lakhani, Karim R., and Eric Von Hippel. "How open source software works:"free" user-to-user assistance." Research policy 32.6 (2003): 923-943.
 Von Krogh, Georg, Sebastian Spaeth, and Karim R. Lakhani. "Community, joining, and specialization in open source software innovation: a case study." Research Policy 32.7 (2003): 1217-1241.
 Lakhani, Karim R., and Robert G. Wolf. "Perspectives on free and open source software." (2005): 3-23.

References

External links 
 Harvard Business School Interview with Lakhani

1970s births
Living people
MIT Sloan School of Management alumni
McMaster University alumni
Harvard Business School faculty